Alberta Provincial Highway No. 838, commonly referred to as Highway 838, is a short highway in central Alberta, Canada.  It runs from Highway 837 across the Red Deer River on the free, cable-operated Bleriot Ferry to Highway 9 / Highway 56 in Drumheller.  Outside of Drumheller, Highway 838 does not pass through any communities.  All of Highway 838 is part of the Dinosaur Trail and is known as North Dinosaur Trail.

The Bleriot Ferry operates from late April to November.

Major intersections 
From northwest to southeast:

References 

838
Drumheller